Põru may refer to several places in Estonia:
Põru, Valga County, village in Estonia
Põru, Võru County, village in Estonia